Juras Požela (12 April 1982 – 16 October 2016) was a Lithuanian politician who served as the Minister of Health of Lithuania from March 2016 until his death on 16 October 2016 from pancreatitis. He was also a Seimas member, Youth and Sports Affairs Committee Chairman and a presidium member of the Social Democratic Party of Lithuania.

References

1982 births
2016 deaths
Health ministers of Lithuania
Social Democratic Party of Lithuania politicians
Vilnius University alumni
Politicians from Vilnius
Deaths from pancreatitis
21st-century Lithuanian politicians